The General Confederation of Democratic Workers (CGTD) is a trade union centre in Colombia. It was founded in 1988.

The CGTD is affiliated with the International Trade Union Confederation.

References

Trade unions in Colombia
International Trade Union Confederation
Trade unions established in 1988